Elections were held in the Australian state of Victoria on Saturday 15 June 1940 to elect 17 of the 34 members of the state's Legislative Council for six year terms. MLC were elected using preferential voting.

Results

Legislative Council

|}

Retiring Members

United Australia
Sir Alan Currie MLC (Nelson)
John Jones MLC (South Western)

Candidates
Sitting members are shown in bold text. Successful candidates are highlighted in the relevant colour. Where there is possible confusion, an asterisk (*) is also used.

See also
1940 Victorian state election

References

1940 elections in Australia
Elections in Victoria (Australia)
1940s in Victoria (Australia)
June 1940 events